Pyroderces cervinella is a moth in the family Cosmopterigidae. It is found on the West Indies.

References

Natural History Museum Lepidoptera generic names catalog

cervinella
Moths described in 1897